The Bulungan language is an Austronesian language spoken in Bulungan Regency, North Kalimantan. The language was the court language of the Bulungan Sultanate. The classification of this language is not clear. Glottolog places it in the Greater North Borneo group.

Spread 
The Bulungan language is predominantly spoken in eight villages in Bulungan Regency, namely:
 District Tanjung Palas: Antutan, Tanjung Palas Ulu, Tanjung Palas Tengah, Tanjung Palas Ilir
 District Tanjung Palas Barat: Mara Ilir
 District Tanjung Palas Timur: Mangkupadi
 District Peso: Long Bia
 District Sekatak: Sekatak Puji

References

Further reading 
 

Languages of North Kalimantan